Panache is a word of French origin that carries the connotation of flamboyant manner and reckless courage, derived from the helmet-plume worn by cavalrymen in the Early Modern period.

The literal translation is a plume, such as is worn on a hat or a helmet; the reference is to King Henry IV of France (13 December 1553 – 14 May 1610), a pleasure-loving and cynical military leader, famed for wearing a striking white plume in his helmet and for his war cry: "Follow my white plume!" (French: "Ralliez-vous à mon panache blanc!").

Cyrano de Bergerac
The epitome of panache and the reason for its establishment as a virtue are found in Edmond Rostand's depiction of Cyrano de Bergerac, in his 1897 play of that name. Prior to Rostand, panache was not necessarily a good thing and was seen by some as a suspect quality.

Panache is referred to explicitly at two points in the play but is implicit throughout: Cyrano's challenges to Montfleury, Valvert, and, at one point, the whole audience at the theatre (Act I), and his nonchalant surrender of a month's salary to pay for the damages; his duel with a hundred footpads at the Porte de Nesle (Act II), as well as his dismissal of the exploit when talking to Roxane ("I've been much braver since then"); his crossing the Spanish lines daily to deliver Roxane's letters (Act IV); and his leaving his deathbed to keep his appointment with her in Act V.

The explicit references bring in the double entendre: first, in Act IV, when sparring with de Guiche over the loss of de Guiche's white sash, he says: "I hardly think King Henry would have doffed his white panache in any danger." A second instance is in Cyrano's last words, which were: "yet there is something still that will always be mine, and when I go to God's presence, there I will doff it and sweep the heavenly pavement with a gesture: something I'll take unstained out of this world... my panache."

Current use
In Canadian French, the word panache may also refer to antlers, such as those of a moose or deer. The Panache River is a tributary of the east bank of the Wetetnagami River flowing into Senneterre in the La Vallée-de-l'Or Regional County Municipality, in the administrative region of Abitibi-Témiscamingue, in Quebec, in Canada. Lake Panache is a lake in the Sudbury area of Ontario. Antlers was the English name of Panache, a 2007 documentary film by Canadian director André-Line Beauparlant.

In Quentin Tarantino's 2012 film Django Unchained, Dr. King Schultz (played by Christopher Waltz) tells slaveowner Calvin Candie (played by Leonardo DiCaprio) that he wants a Mandingo fighter with "panache". Candie, despite claiming to be a francophile, does not understand what this means. Schultz then describes it as a "sense of showmanship". As referenced earlier, this is a bit of an anachronism because the word "panache" did not take this connotation until after Cyrano de Bergerac was published in 1897, and Django is set in 1858. 

In Wes Anderson's 2014 film The Grand Budapest Hotel, the main character's ubiquitous perfume is called 'L'air de Panache'.

In season one, episode four of Amazon Studio's "The English", which takes place in 1890, a retelling of an incident 15 years earlier (1875)  included dialogue with the word "panache", meaning 'flair'. Which, as noted above, the word did not take this meeting until 1897.

Panache is a loan word that remains in use across English dialects, denoting a style that is confident and flamboyant.

Notes

References
Cyrano de Bergerac (Penguin translation by Carol Clark)

External links

French words and phrases
English words